Fathers Theodore Hesburgh and Edmund Joyce is an outdoor statue on the University of Notre Dame campus. Located on the South side of the Hesburgh Library facing the reflecting pool, the sculpture was designed and built by artist Lou Cella, a member of the Rotblatt-Amrany Fine Art Studio, and is currently owned by the University of Notre Dame.

Description
The larger than life bronze statue of Fathers Theodore Hesburgh and Edmund Joyce welcomes each and every visitor entering the south side of the Hesburgh Library. Father Joyce (left) stands 7-feet-4-inches in height, and Father Hesburgh (right) stands 7ft tall. Hesburgh can be seen staring off into the distance, a trait that Cella remembered as one of the deciding factors for his maquette being chosen out of many other submissions to create the sculpture. “When I try to capture personalities, I focus on the eyes,” Cella stated in an interview about the piece.

Two distinguishing factors in the sculpture include the specific Clerical collar worn by Father Joyce and a small dove pin on Father Hesburgh’s lapel. In reference to these additions Cella said, “these subtle differences are necessary to add to the personality communication of the sculpture.” Cella’s uncles, current priests at Notre Dame, informed him of Joyce’s “fashion-forward” collar and also mentioned that you’d never see Father Hesburgh without his dove pin. “Those are the kind of details that I want included when people look at this. You wonder how much detail there can be when sculpting a priest in a black suit, but certain details made a big impact,” noted Cella.

In choosing the exact facial expressions for the statues after being commissioned, Cella notes, “I was given a lot of help there. There was a specific photo of Father Hesburgh in particular that they liked of him standing outside of Corby Hall, pretty much in the pose that you see. There was a look on his face that they liked.” The time period represented in the statue was circa 1975. Cella remembers during the installation that fairly new onlookers from the library who didn’t know Hesburgh during this time period would “looked at it and ask ‘that’s father Ted?’” whereas more senior members of the library staff or faculty who knew him better said it “totally looked like him.”

Historical information
Father Theodore Hesburgh and Father Edmund Joyce were president and executive vice president of the University of Notre Dame from 1952 to 1987. Joyce, an essential figure to the National Collegiate Athletic Association and whose namesake is Notre Dame's major athletic facility, the Edmund P. Joyce Center, passed away at the age of 87 in May 2004. Joyce’s work during his life involved forming the College Football Association and serving as treasurer and working with issues involving the educational integrity of college athletes. Joyce received the Distinguished American Award from the National Football Foundation in 1977. After Joyce served 35 years as chief financial officer, Father Hesburgh fittingly gave his eulogy at his Christian burial mass.
Father Theodore Hesburgh, a highly revered figure on Notre Dame’s campus and around the world, had major impacts on national and international affairs throughout his life. His work has touched a myriad of social sectors from peaceful uses of atomic energy to treatment of Vietnam offenders to Third World development, immigration reform, and much more. Major facilitator of justice, Hesburgh was appointed a charter member of the U.S. Commission on Civil Rights in 1957 where he chaired from 1969 to 1972. For more on the accomplishments of Father Hesburgh, see external link below.
The sculpture aimed to commemorate not only the incredible lives of each of the individuals but also their lifelong friendship. Shortly after their retirement, the two priests took an unforgettable vacation together, in which Father Hesburgh referenced in his 1992 book “Travels with Ted & Ned.”

Location history
The sculpture is located on the South side of the Hesburgh Library facing the reflecting pool. The Hesburgh Library, built in 1963 and named after Father Hesburgh in 1987, housed Father Hesburgh’s office during his service to the University. Located on the 13th floor, Hesburgh’s office faced the Main Quad, and remains locked and preserved to this day. For more information, see external links below.

Acquisition
After sculptor Lou Cella constructed the piece in his studio in Highwood, IL, his team from the Rotblatt studio helped to install the sculpture in its current location. The exact commission Cella received for this particular project is unknown, but publicly accessible commission values have ranged from $62,000 for a bronze sculpture of Orville Redenbacher to over $100, 000 for his bronze depiction of Chicago White Sox player Paul Konerko.

The statue was formally presented to Notre Dame on Saturday, Oct. 22, 2005 at 9:45 a.m before a home football game on behalf of the University’s Class of 1953. Cella and his uncle both attended the ceremony. The Class of 1953 was the first class to graduate under the leadership of both Father Hesburgh and Father Joyce, and the sculpture was presented at their 50th reunion. Notre Dame’s president, Rev. John Jenkins, gave a blessing at the ceremony, accompanied by a speech from a representative of the Class of 1953. Members of the class were integral in the process of judging the competition to choose the sculptor of the project.

The competition was instigated after a 3rd party outside the commission wanted to do something to commemorate the two figures and approached the board. The competition held two rounds because in the initial round, the committee was not happy with any of the submission ideas, so they re-initiated the competition with a more specific directive. In this second round, they asked for submissions of 2-feet tall miniatures - known as maquettes - cast in resin and painted over to simulate bronze. 

Cella stated, “they got a taste for different artists and sculptures styles. The Class of ‘53 was central to the competition. When a committee gets involved, they can decide anything for any particular reason, so I was incredibly honored to have been chosen.”

Cella reminisced that a senior member of the committee had said to him that “I had caught a particular look in Father Hesburgh’s eye in a way that reflected him perfectly” because Father Hesburgh was known to always be “looking forward to helping new people and solving future problems.” Cella additionally noted, “It’s a challenge in miniature pieces [to capture a look like that], and to get that compliment meant a lot.”

Artist
Lou Cella, graduate of Illinois State University ‘85, has been exposed to the arts his entire life. After dabbling in graphic design after college, Cella decided to move into three-dimensional art, and enrolled in classes at the Rotblatt-Amrany Fine Art Studio, where he then began working after completing his classes. Cella continues to make art out of the studio today. To see a more extensive list of Cella’s work see external links below.

Cella was honored to have won the competition to design the Fathers Theodore Hesburgh and Edmund Joyce statue for the University of Notre Dame. Cella has been a lifelong Notre Dame fan and often visited his brother and two resident priest uncles on campus (Father James Banas and Reverend Leonard Banas). Cella himself said, “When you have two people who are intertwined with the ND community, you get to know a lot about the campus. I had a personal connection to the school, and even though I didn’t attend Notre Dame, it’s kind of in my DNA.” 

When he was in college at Illinois State University, Cella remembered watching Father Hesburgh’s 60-minute interview. “I was about 20 years old at the time and I was really struck by the man,” said Cella. “I had read his book and I had a connection to him. As you read his book, you’re reading about interactions with people going back as far as Pope Paul VI and Martin Luther King Jr, and the list never ends.” Cella does a lot of sculptures of baseball players, and said that while he is proud of every statue he has contributed to, he believes his work with Father Hesburgh was particularly unique. “When you do something like Father Hes who gives people opportunities to have better lives, it’s really special,” Cella reminisced nearly twelve years after the statue’s dedication.

Cella was able to meet Father Hesburgh on many occasions before making the statue, saying, “We would go to the games and then go to dinner at Corby Hall with our uncles and Father Hes would come.” He remembers the last time he saw Father Hesburgh very distinctly on the night Hesburgh was celebrating his 95th birthday:

‘‘“On that night, I introduced my wife to him. My wife is a very spiritual woman, and he gave her a blessing when he met her. She went up in tears on the spot. That moment was another reflection of how he seemed to always be looking at ways to make people feel like they count, whoever they may happen to be. He had no way of knowing how much something like that would mean to her, both then and now. The holy spirit is very central to our lives and to go and see that sculpture again with my wife after it was built meant even more. It wasn’t just her being proud of her husband, she had a connection to the man.”’’ - Lou Cella

Cella remembered that during the time he built the sculpture, “it was almost impossible to find someone who didn’t have profound love for Father Hesburgh and who he didn’t mean something to.”

Condition
Through nearly twelve years of harsh South Bend, IN winters, the bronze coloring has begun to tarnish to a greenish hue, due to chemical reactions between the copper in the alloys and atmosphere known as oxidation. The resulting discoloration is most severe in the bottom half of the sculpture. No concrete restoration efforts have been made since the installation in 2005, and it is unknown if and when the sculpture will be restored in the future.

See also
 Hesburgh Library 
 University of Notre Dame
 Theodore Hesburgh

References

External links
Lou Cella Biography on the Rotblatt-Amrany Fine Art Studio Website
Lou Cella Bio from John Hersey High School Alumni Page
New Sculpture Honors ND’s Hesburgh, Joyce
Remembering Father Joyce
National Football Foundation on Father Edmund Joyce
Father Hesburgh’s novel on travels with Father Joyce
Image of Reflecting Pool
Father Hesburgh’s Autobiography
Father Hesburgh reflection
Lou Cella on bronze White Sox statue

2005 sculptures
Bronze sculptures in Indiana
Outdoor sculptures in Notre Dame
University of Notre Dame Public Art Collection